Waterlink Way is a cyclepath and walking route in South East London. It extends from South Norwood Country Park (near Elmers End station) to the Cutty Sark ship in Greenwich, a total of eight miles.

The Waterlink Way connects a number of parks and green spaces in South East London – including Ladywell Fields and Brookmill Park – while following the Pool and Ravensbourne rivers. The route was designed to be accessible, with a large number of railway stations including Kent House, Lower Sydenham, Ladywell, Lewisham and Greenwich en route.

Other routes

The Waterlink Way forms part of National Cycle Network (Route 21 between London and the Sussex coast). 

In Cator Park, Beckenham the cyclepath links with the Capital Ring and Green Chain Walk long-distance footpaths.

Signage

The WW is shown on road signs and sometimes with pavement markers.

There are further Waterlink Way signs along NCN21 beyond its official southern end point, for example at New Addington.

References

External links
Tourist Info on the route
Transport for London information on Waterlink Way and other cycle routes in the capital

Cycleways in London
National Cycle Routes
Transport in the Royal Borough of Greenwich
Transport in the London Borough of Lewisham
Transport in the London Borough of Bromley
Transport in the London Borough of Croydon